Collatus is a genus of very small and minute sea snails with an operculum, marine gastropod mollusks in the family Vitrinellidae.

Species
 Collatus conversus Rubio & Rolán, 2018 
 Collatus labri Rubio & Rolán, 2018 
 Collatus papuensis Rubio & Rolán, 2018 
 Collatus parvus Rubio & Rolán, 2018 
 Collatus regularis Rubio & Rolán, 2018 
 Collatus surrectus Rubio & Rolán, 2018

References

 Rubio F. & Rolán E. (2018). A type species for the genus Collatus Rubio & Rolán, 2018  (Gastropoda: Vitrinellidae). Gloria Maris. 57(2): 67.
note: unavailable: not declared intentionally new 
 Rubio F. & Rolán E. (2019). Collatus (Gastropoda: Vitrinellidae): formal description and designation of its type species. Iberus. 37(2): 275–276. page(s): 275

Vitrinellidae